Nikola Kozlevo Municipality is a municipality (obshtina) in Shumen Province, Northeastern Bulgaria, located in the Ludogorie geographical region, part of the Danubian Plain. It is named after its administrative centre - the village of Nikola Kozlevo.

Settlements 

Nikola Kozlevo Municipality includes the following 11 places, all of them are villages:

Demography 
The following table shows the change of the population during the last four decades.

Ethnic composition
According to the 2011 census, among those who answered the optional question on ethnic identification, the ethnic composition of the municipality was the following:

Vital statistics

Religion
According to the latest Bulgarian census of 2011, the religious composition, among those who answered the optional question on religious identification, was the following:

Nearly all ethnic Turks are Muslim, while nearly all Bulgarians are Orthodox Christians. A majority of the Roma people are Muslim, with a large Christian minority.

See also
Provinces of Bulgaria
Municipalities of Bulgaria
List of cities and towns in Bulgaria

References

External links
 Info website 

Municipalities in Shumen Province